Richard Norman Ley (born November 2, 1948) is a Canadian former professional ice hockey player who played in the National Hockey League (NHL) and World Hockey Association (WHA).

Playing career
Ley was drafted by the Toronto Maple Leafs in the third round (16th overall) in the 1966 NHL Amateur Draft. He played four seasons with the Maple Leafs (1968–69 to 1971–72) in the NHL before leaving to play with the New England Whalers of the WHA. He would remain with the Whalers' organisation in the WHA until that league folded in 1979. The Whalers, along with three other teams from the WHA's remaining six, were absorbed into the NHL in 1979. Ley made the transition with the New England Whalers (who would become the Hartford Whalers) and finished his professional playing career in 1981.

Ley spent six years as the Whalers' captain and was one of three players in Hartford Whalers' history to have his jersey number retired (#2), joining Gordie Howe and John McKenzie. Following the Whalers move to Raleigh, the Hurricanes ceased to honor Ley's #2 and McKenzie's #19, and returned the numbers to circulation, although #2 was re-retired by the Hurricanes, this time in honor of Glen Wesley.

Ley and his wife Ellen have a daughter, Kathleen.

Honours
In 2010, he was elected as an inaugural inductee into the World Hockey Association Hall of Fame.

Coaching career
Ley began his coaching career in International Hockey League, where he coached the Muskegon Lumberjacks to four first-place finishes and one championship during his tenure between 1984 and 1988.  He was then hired by former Leafs defence partner Pat Quinn to coach the Vancouver Canucks IHL affiliate in Milwaukee.

After one season there, Ley was the coach of the Hartford Whalers for 2 seasons from 1989 to 1991, leading them to consecutive 4th-place finishes and first round playoff defeats at the hands of their New England rival the Boston Bruins in both seasons.

Ley then rejoined the Canucks. After serving as an assistant coach under Quinn for three seasons from 1991–92 to 1993–94, Ley became the 12th head coach in Vancouver Canucks' history on August 10, 1994. In 121 regular season games as head coach, the Canucks posted a record of 47–48–26. He also served the Canucks in a professional scouting capacity in 1996–97 and 1997–98.

In 1998, he was once again hired by Quinn as an assistant coach with the Toronto Maple Leafs and held that role for eight seasons until he was relieved of his duties at the conclusion of the 2005–06 season.

Career statistics

Regular season and playoffs

International

Coaching statistics

See also
Hartford Whalers
Carolina Hurricanes
Vancouver Canucks
Toronto Maple Leafs
World Hockey Association
defenceman (ice hockey)

References

External links

1948 births
Living people
Canadian ice hockey defencemen
Hartford Whalers captains
Hartford Whalers coaches
Hartford Whalers players
Hartford Whalers scouts
Ice hockey people from Ontario
National Hockey League players with retired numbers
New England Whalers players
Niagara Falls Flyers players
People from Orillia
Toronto Maple Leafs coaches
Toronto Maple Leafs draft picks
Toronto Maple Leafs players
Vancouver Canucks coaches
Vancouver Canucks scouts
Canadian ice hockey coaches